NA-146 Khanewal-III is a constituency for the National Assembly of Pakistan. Constituency old Numbers NA-152 (2018-2023) & NA-158 (2002-2018).

Election 2002 

General elections were held on 10 Oct 2002 in NA-158. Pir Muhammad Aslam Bodla of PPP won by 73,481 votes.

Election 2008 

General elections were held on 18 Feb 2008 in NA-158. Pir Muhammad Aslam Bodla of PML-Q won by 57,777 votes.

Election 2013 

General elections were held on 11 May 2013 in NA-158. Pir Muhammad Aslam Bodla of PML-N won by 94,050 votes and became the  member of National Assembly.

Election 2018

By-election 2023 
A by-election will be held on 19 March 2023 due to the resignation of Zahoor Hussain Qureshi, the previous MNA from this seat.

See also
NA-145 Khanewal-II
NA-147 Khanewal-IV

References

External links 
Election result's official website

NA-158